October is the soundtrack album to the 2018 Bollywood film of the same name, directed by Shoojit Sircar. The album is composed by Shantanu Moitra,
Anupam Roy and Abhishek Arora and features playback singers such as Armaan Malik, Rahat Fateh Ali Khan, Sunidhi Chauhan and Monali Thakur. It was released on 28 March 2018 by Zee Music Company and in general, the album received positive response from the critics. The album consists of five tracks whose lyrics are penned by Swanand Kirkire, Tanveer Ghazi and Abhiruchi Chand.

Conception, development and production
Shantanu Moitra began composing the score in April 2017, after hearing the film's script. Sircar's preoccupation with love and nature are among the factors which attracted Moitra to the project. Additionally, he wanted to experiment with the element of "silence" in the background score. He said, "There is so much artificially created noise around us, under which sensitive, beautiful emotions get buried. October gave me an opportunity to move away from the chaos." Speaking about the theme behind the score, Moitra said, "We didn't want a reference melody. We wanted the theme to be in place. Once the theme was ready, the rest of the background score emerged from that."

Composition
Along with the score, Moitra also composed "October (Theme Music)", a violin-led instrumental track. In his own words, he was "happy" that the theme was included in the album. He composed two more tracks. "Manwaa", penned by Moitra's frequent collaborator Swanand Kirkire, progresses without a rhythm section until the percussion kicks in midway. On comparing the composition of the song with his earlier composition "Naam Adaa Likhna" from the film Yahaan, Moitra said, “Earlier, at the time of Yahaan, there wasn’t the pressure, but now, the thinking is that people won’t listen to a song unless there is a groove of some kind but I don’t think so.” "Chal", another song composed by Moitra, is an upbeat retro-funk track created with a “Nazia Hassan-like soundscape” in mind.

Singles
"October Theme" and "Theher Ja" were first announced by Varun Dhawan on his official Twitter handle on 18 and 20 March 2018, and were released on 19 and 21 March 2018, respectively. The third song "Tab Bhi Tu" was also announced in a similar way on 26 March 2018, but was released on 28 March 2018, along with the album and included in it. An official promotional remix single "There Ja (DJ Notorious remix)" was released on 13 April 2018.

Reception
Gaurang Chauhan of Times Now, in his review, noted that "October has quite a few good tunes" and gave it  stars. He appreciated music and lyrics of other tracks but heavily criticized the track Tab Bhi Tu because it seemed "quite forced in its approach." Vipin Nair of The Hindu said that the film has got "… a decent soundtrack" and gave it a rating of 3/5 on his website. Debarati Sen from The Times of India said it is a "cerebral, creative" album and different from other Bollywood albums. She also added that the tracks are "delectable" and connected in a "subtle way" despite being different from each other.

Track listing

Theher Ja
The video for the Armaan Malik version of "Theher Ja" was created by One Digital Entertainment. The video was released on 3 May 2018 through the official YouTube handle of the singer. Filmed inside a car and an amusement park, it features Armaan and his two friends depicting their road trip to Imagica.

References

2018 soundtrack albums
Filmi soundtracks
Hindi-language albums